Olive Onelani Kilifi (born September 28, 1986) is an American rugby union player, who plays prop for the United States national rugby union team and for the Utah Warriors of Major League Rugby (MLR).

Kilifi attended Tyee High School in Seatac, Washington. 

He debuted for the U.S. national team during the end of year tests in November 2013, earning two substitute appearances. Kilifi started in both of the March 2014 qualifying matches against Uruguay for the 2015 World Cup, and is considered one of the U.S. team's best scrummagers.

In early 2016, Kilifi signed for the Sacramento Express of the newly formed PRO Rugby competition, but the competition folded after the 2016 season. 

Kilifi began playing with the Seattle Seawolves of Major League Rugby in 2018 and is currently a 2-time champion, winning back-to-back Major League Rugby titles in the 2018 and 2019 seasons. He was traded to the Utah Warriors in 2021.

References

1986 births
American rugby union players
Living people
Rugby union props
Sportspeople from Seattle
Sacramento Express players
Seattle Seawolves players
United States international rugby union players
Utah Warriors players